Nayala is one of the 45 provinces of Burkina Faso and is in Boucle du Mouhoun Region.

Its capital is Toma.

Education
In 2011 the province had 133 primary schools and 20 secondary schools.

Healthcare
In 2011 the province had 20 health and social promotion centers (Centres de santé et de promotion sociale), 3 doctors and 72 nurses.

Departments
Nayala is divided into 6 departments:

See also
Regions of Burkina Faso
Provinces of Burkina Faso
Departments of Burkina Faso

References

 
Provinces of Burkina Faso